Real Juventud may refer to:

C.D. Real Juventud, Honduran football club based in Santa Bárbara, Santa Bárbara
Real Juventud San Joaquín, also called Real San Joaquín, Chilean football club based in the city San Joaquín, Chile